A business suite is a set of business software functions enabling the core business and business support processes inside and beyond the boundaries of an organization.

Overview 
The key characteristic of a business suite is the delivery of end-to-end business processes which span organizational boundaries such as business departments and locations. In the last years the focus of the business processes supported by business suites has expanded to integrate business partners such as customers, suppliers and service providers.

Business Suites are generally rooted in the traditional ERP systems that are based on a common data model used to store the data to be shared between departments and their business processes. Most corporate ERP systems have been enhanced and complemented by additional applications over the years. As a result, the total cost of ownership (TCO) grows, process integrity across applications is at stake, and the flexibility to consistently change and optimize business processes suffers. The vendors of business suites claim to address these issues.

Topics 
The issues with business process visibility, flexibility, efficiency, and integrity in heterogeneous business application environments have recently created 2 basic types of business suites:

 The "cumulative" business suite consists of a set of previously separate applications that are connected at the middleware or database level. The absence of a unified data and process model complicates the implementation of end-to-end processes with ensured process integrity for customers. System integrators are addressing this issue at the expense of a business suite owner.
 The "organic" business suite delivers end-to-end business processes designed to run in one offering. Modern organic business suites provide additional openness to integrate with other applications or extend processes to business partners through SOA technologies.

Business Process Scope 
A business suite usually encompasses all core business and business support processes of an organization, unlike business applications such as treasury management or CRM  that have been designed to serve a single line of business.

Since no vendor today offers applications covering all business process requirements of larger organizations, vendors complement their application portfolio through acquisitions or through cooperation with specialized partners.

Two strategies
A "coverage through acquisition" strategy is confined to the processes that are entirely under the control of a single organization, while the "coverage through cooperation" approach can also enable and support processes that span the boundaries of multiple organizations like suppliers, customers, banks.

Foundational processes
The foundational set of business processes supported by a business suite includes business support processes to manage financials, build, develop and administer the workforce, run facilities, support the procurement of generic goods and services. Those foundational processes are required to sustain a functional enterprise that complies with all regulatory requirements.

Value drivers
The next layer of business processes is sometimes grouped by the main value drivers or differentiators of a company:
 Development, production, sales, and distribution of products
 Acquisition, operations, and compliance of production assets
 Management of the production, logistics, and distribution network
 Marketing, sales, production, and service for customers
 Cost/performance-optimized procurement, production, and operations

Processes in support of value drivers
Key processes supporting those value drivers invariably span organizational boundaries and are relevant for multiple lines of business. A typical business process that connects organizational entities is "order to cash" which can span sales, production, finance, logistics, billing and dispute management and influences important key performance indicators of the involved areas like "free cash-flow", "customer satisfaction", "customer profitability", "fulfillment cost".

Some business suites offer a layer of deep industry processes - either through industry extensions of the core business suite or through a network of frequently certified 3rd party software providers which adopt compatible or identical process and data models.

Current status
Today, no commercial business suite can cover all business process requirements of a large organization. Modern business suites offer an environment in which an organization can develop or modify business processes reusing the supplied standard processes. Some advanced business suites allow the fast composition of new business processes from process fragments or process steps.

See also
 SAP Business Suite
 Oracle E-Business Suite

 Business software